Robert Scott "Scotty" Robertson III (February 1, 1930 – August 18, 2011) was an American basketball coach.  He was the first coach for the New Orleans Jazz (now the Utah Jazz), and he later coached the Chicago Bulls and the Detroit Pistons. He also has a stint as assistant coach for the Indiana Pacers, San Antonio Spurs, Phoenix Suns, and the Miami Heat.

Career
Robertson was born in Fort Smith in western Arkansas. As a sixth grader, he  moved to Shreveport, Louisiana, where he played basketball and baseball for C. E. Byrd High School, from which he graduated in 1947. He attended the University of Texas at Austin, Texas, but graduated in 1951 from Louisiana Tech University in Ruston. He obtained a master's degree from the University of Arkansas at Fayetteville. After his graduation from Louisiana Tech, he played baseball in the Chicago White Sox organization before returning to basketball as a coach.

Death and legacy
At the time of his death of lung cancer at the age of eighty-one, Robertson was residing in Ruston, the location of Louisiana Tech, with his wife the former Betty Lou Lancaster. He was survived by his daughters, Libby Robertson Power of Frisco, Texas, Claudia Robertson Fowler (husband Royal) of Franklin, Tennessee, and Vicki Robertson Page of Ruston. He had ten grandchildren.

Services were held on August 21, 2011, at the Trinity United Methodist Church in Ruston. Interment followed at Forest Lawn Memorial Park in Ruston.

In 2012, the Robert "Scotty" Robertson Memorial Gymnasium was renovated and named in Robertson's honor.

Head coaching record

High school 
Robertson coached at C. E. Byrd High School for eight years, having accomplished a 163–91 record.

Collegiate

Professional record

|-
| style="text-align:left;"|New Orleans
| style="text-align:left;"|
|15||1||14||.067|| style="text-align:center;"|(fired)||—||—||—||—
| style="text-align:center;"|—
|-
| style="text-align:left;"|Chicago
| style="text-align:left;"|
|26||11||15||.423|| style="text-align:center;"|5th in Midwest||—||—||—||—
| style="text-align:center;"|Missed Playoffs
|-
| style="text-align:left;"|Detroit
| style="text-align:left;"|
|82||21||61||.256|| style="text-align:center;"|6th in Central||—||—||—||—
| style="text-align:center;"|Missed Playoffs
|-
| style="text-align:left;"|Detroit
| style="text-align:left;"|
|82||39||43||.476|| style="text-align:center;"|3rd in Central||—||—||—||—
| style="text-align:center;"|Missed Playoffs
|-
| style="text-align:left;"|Detroit
| style="text-align:left;"|
|82||37||45||.451|| style="text-align:center;"|3rd in Central||—||—||—||—
| style="text-align:center;"|Missed Playoffs
|- class="sortbottom"
| style="text-align:left;"|Career
| ||287||109||178||.380|| ||—||—||—||—

References

External links
 BasketballReference.com: Scotty Robertson

1930 births
2011 deaths
20th-century Methodists
21st-century Methodists
American men's basketball coaches
American men's basketball players
American United Methodists
Basketball coaches from Arkansas
Basketball coaches from Louisiana
Basketball players from Arkansas
Basketball players from Shreveport, Louisiana
Baton Rouge Red Sticks players
C. E. Byrd High School alumni
Chicago Bulls head coaches
College men's basketball head coaches in the United States
Deaths from cancer in Louisiana
Deaths from lung cancer
Detroit Pistons head coaches
High school basketball coaches in the United States
Indiana Pacers assistant coaches
Louisiana Tech Bulldogs baseball players
Baseball players from Shreveport, Louisiana
Louisiana Tech Bulldogs basketball coaches
Louisiana Tech Bulldogs basketball players
Miami Heat assistant coaches
New Orleans Jazz head coaches
Phoenix Suns assistant coaches
San Antonio Spurs assistant coaches
Sportspeople from Fort Smith, Arkansas
Sportspeople from Ruston, Louisiana
University of Arkansas alumni
University of Texas at Austin alumni